Ronald Garry Hancock (January 23, 1954 – October 10, 2015) was a professional baseball player. He played in Major League Baseball (MLB) for the Boston Red Sox and Oakland Athletics in parts of six seasons spanning 1978–1984, primarily as a reserve outfielder.

Early years
Upon graduation from Brandon High School in Brandon, Florida, Hancock was selected by the Texas Rangers in the 22nd round of the 1972 MLB Draft, but chose instead to play ball at the University of South Carolina. He was drafted again in the secondary phases of 1973, 1974 and 1975 by the Cleveland Indians, Rangers and California Angels, respectively, but did not signed and remained in school. He finally was signed when the Indians made him the number seventeen overall selection of the 1976 MLB Draft's January secondary phase.

Professional career
Hancock batted .302 in two seasons in the Cleveland organization before being dealt to the Red Sox in exchange for Jack Baker following the  season. 

After hit a .303 average for the Pawtucket Red Sox through July , Hancock was called up to Boston. He remained with the club for the rest of the season as a fourth outfielder and pinch hitter, batting .225 with four runs batted in and ten runs scored.

He received his second call up to the majors in June  and remained with the Bosox through . His most productive season for Boston came in 1980, when he hit a slash line of .287/.300/.443	with four home runs and 19 RBI in 46 games.

In fifteen plate appearances for the Bosox, he had just one walk to show for it. That winter, he was traded by Boston along with third baseman Carney Lansford and a minor leaguer to Oakland for outfielder Tony Armas and catcher Jeff Newman. 

Hancock hit .273 with nine homers and 30 RBI in a career-high 101 games for the Athletics in 1983. He hit poorly the following season and was released, then retired from the game.

Hancock was a longtime resident of Valrico, Florida, where he died in 2015 at the age of 61.

Sources

External links

1954 births
2015 deaths
Baseball players from Tampa, Florida
Boston Red Sox players
Hillsborough Hawks baseball players
Jersey City Indians players
Major League Baseball outfielders
Oakland Athletics players
Pawtucket Red Sox players
People from Brandon, Florida
San Jose Bees players
South Carolina Gamecocks baseball players
Tacoma Tigers players
Toledo Mud Hens players
University of South Carolina alumni
People from Valrico, Florida
Sportspeople from Hillsborough County, Florida